The 2007–08 Tunisian Ligue Professionnelle 1 was the 82nd season of top-tier football in Tunisia. It saw Club Africain crowned as champions. Stade Gabésien and Espérance Sportive de Zarzis were relegated to Ligue Professionnelle 2.

It was played in a traditional league format, with 14 teams playing 26 rounds, two matches against every opposing team.

Club Sportif Sfaxien had two points deducted from their end of season total due to walking off field before completion of their round 15 game against Espérance Sportive de Tunis.

Club directory and team locations

Results

League table

Result table

Leaders

References

External links
 2007–08 Ligue 1 on RSSSF.com

Tunisian Ligue Professionnelle 1 seasons
1
Tun